BMC Bioinformatics is a peer-reviewed open access scientific journal covering bioinformatics and computational biology published by BioMed Central. It was established in 2000, and has been one of the fastest growing and most successful journals in the BMC Series of journals, publishing 1,000 articles in its first five years.

Abstracting and indexing
The journal is abstracted and indexed in:

According to the Journal Citation Reports, the journal has a 2020 impact factor of 3.169.

References

External links

BioMed Central academic journals
Bioinformatics and computational biology journals
Creative Commons Attribution-licensed journals
Publications established in 2000